Lion as a name may refer to:

People with the family name
Alfred Lion (1909–1987), German-American record producer
Joel Lion (born 1964), Israeli diplomat
Margo Lion (1944–2020), American theatrical producer
Moshe Lion (born 1961), Israeli politician
P. Lion (born 1959), Italian singer

People with the given name
Lion Feuchtwanger (1884–1958), a German novelist
Lion Philips (1794-1866), a Dutch merchant
Lion van Minden (1880–1944), Dutch Olympic fencer who was killed in Auschwitz

Fictional characters with the family/given name
Jeremy Lion, comedic character created by Justin Edwards
Lion El'Jonson , primarch of the Dark Angels legion from Warhammer 40000 universe
Lion Rafale, from video game Virtua Fighter Series
Lion Ushiromiya, from the Japanese sound novel Umineko no Naku Koro ni

See also
 Lions (surname)
 Lyon (disambiguation), people with the surname Lyon

Given names
Surnames from nicknames